The 2022 Chevrolet Detroit Grand Prix (formally known as the Chevrolet Detroit Grand Prix presented by Lear) was a sports car race held at The Raceway on Belle Isle in Detroit, Michigan on June 4, 2022. It was the sixth round of the 2022 IMSA SportsCar Championship and the fourth round of the 2022 WeatherTech Sprint Cup. Chip Ganassi Racing's No. 01 piloted by Sebastien Bourdais and Renger van der Zande earned the victory in DPi, while the VasserSullivan No. 17 Lexus RC F GT3 driven by Ben Barnicoat and Kyle Kirkwood won in the GTD class.

Background

Entries

A total of 16 cars took part in the event, split across two classes. 6 were entered in DPi and 10 in GTD.

Qualifying

Qualifying results

Results

Race 

References

External links

Chevrolet Detroit Grand Prix (IMSA)
Chevrolet Detroit Grand Prix (IMSA)
2022 WeatherTech SportsCar Championship season